Aksel Ludvig Fronth (1925–2000) was a Norwegian architect. He particularly specialized in building modern-style churches.

Works
 Tyssedal Church (1965)
 Greåker Church (1974)
 Landro Church (1977)
 Brattvåg Church (1977)
 Skårer Church (1978)
 Valen Church (1978)
 Indre Sula Church (1984)
 Kjølstad Church (1986)
 Fjellhamar Church (1989)
 Olsvik Church (1990)

References

1925 births
2000 deaths
20th-century Norwegian architects
Norwegian ecclesiastical architects